Bouldering competitions at the 2019 World Beach Games in Doha, Qatar was held from 13 to 14 October 2019. Nineteen athletes competed in each of the men's and women's events.

Qualification
A total of 40 athletes (20 for each gender) vied for the coveted spots with a maximum of two sent to compete for the international quota qualifiers, while the other NOCs might have one athlete per event. Host nation Qatar will be ensured one quota place each gender. The remaining 5 quotas will be eligible for each continental champions.

Qualification summary

Men's qualification

Women's qualification

Medal summary

Medal table

Medalists

Participating nations

References

External links
Results Book

Climbing competitions
Bouldering
2018
World Beach Games